Ayşe Sultan is the name of several concubine, consorts and daughters of Ottoman Sultans:

Ayşe Sultan (daughter of Bayezid II) (1465–1515), daughter of Sultan Bayezid II and his concubine Nigar Hatun
Gülbahar Hatun (mother of Selim I), concubine of Sultan Bayezid II and mother of Sultan Selim I
Ayşe Hafsa Sultan, concubine of Sultan Selim I, and mother and Valide Sultan of Sultan Süleyman I
Ayşe Hatun (wife of Selim I), Crimean princess, daughter of Khan Meñli I Giray|Menli I Giray, consort of Sultan Selim I and before of his half-brother Şehzade Mehmed
Ayşe Hümaşah Sultan (1541–c. 1598), daughter of Mihrimah Sultan and granddaughter of Suleiman the Magnificent and Hürrem Sultan
Ayşe Sultan (daughter of Murad III) (1565 –1605), daughter of Sultan Murad III and his Haseki Safiye Sultan
Ayşe Sultan (daughter of Mehmed III)]] (c. 1587?–?), daughter of Sultan Mehmed III and his consort Handan Sultan
Ayşe Sultan (daughter of Ahmed I) (1605 or 1608 –1657), daughter of Sultan Ahmed I and his Haseki Kösem Sultan
Ayşe Sultan (Haseki of Osman II) (died 1640), consort of Sultan Osman II
Ayşe Sultan (Haseki of Murad IV) (died ), consort of Sultan Murad IV
Ayşe Sultan, fourth Haseki of Sultan Ibrahim 
Ayşe Sultan (daughter of Mustafa II) (1696–1752), daughter of Sultan Mustafa II
Ayşe Sultan (daughter of Ahmed III) (1715 –1776), daughter of Sultan Ahmed III and his consort Emine Musli Kadın 
Ayşe Sultan (daughter of Abdul Hamid II) (1887–1960), daughter of Sultan Abdul Hamid II and his consort Müşfika Kadın

See also
 Ayşe Hatun (disambiguation)
 Aisha Sultan Begum, Mughal queen